Nanpu may refer to:

Nanpū, limited express train service in Japan operated by JR Shikoku
Nanpu Bridge, Bridge in Shanghai, China
Nanpu Bridge station, station on Shanghai Metro Line 4
Nanpu Island, island in Panyu, Guangdong, China
Nanpu Town, town in Quanzhou, Fujian, China

See also
 Nampo (disambiguation)